Tsaghkasar is a village in the Talin Municipality of the Aragatsotn Province of Armenia. The village has a shrine dedicated to Tadevos the Apostle and ruins of a cycoplean fort.

References 

Populated places in Aragatsotn Province